Hameed Sheikh is an actor and producer from Pakistan who is known for roles in Khuda Kay Liye, Operation O21 and Moor.

Personal life
Residing in Quetta, the capital city of Balochistan, Pakistan, Sheikh is fluent in Urdu, Brahui, Sindhi, Punjabi, Dari, Persian, Seraiki, Balochi and Hindko.

Career

Kandhar Break
In 2008, Sheikh produced Kandhar Break, a political thriller set in 1999 which tells the story of an Englishman who must escape the Taliban regime in Afghanistan. While filming a night scene in the desert, a group associated with the Taliban attacked the Pakistani members of the film crew. Four crew members were shot while leaving the compound and arriving at the set; they all survived. Much like the lead character of the movie, director David Whitney and his crew were forced to leave Pakistan with the help of local security forces. Only 75% of the shoot was completed by then. Later, Sheikh arranged funding for the remaining part, which was filmed in Tunisia.

Moor
Sheikh was approached by Jami, director and writer of Moor, to play the role of an old man whose family was affected by the closure of a railway station in Zhob Valley, Baluchistan. In preparation for the role, Sheikh gained a lot of weight and changed his posture and walking style. He described his role as "genuinely challenging", but didn't charge a fee for the project since he believed the film would open doors for young actors of Baluchistan.

Filmography

Film

Television

PTV Quetta Center Produced Drama Series contains 7 episode (Palay Shah) Palay Khan in 1990 as a tribute to Palay Khan Khosthi involvement in the freedom movement against British Raj. Palay Khan was played by Jamal Shah, and Palay's brother Katey Khan was portrayed by Hayatullah Khan Durrani while Hameed Sheikh played the character of the Nephew of Palay Khan.

Awards and nominations
 2005 The 1st Indus Drama Awards: Nominated for Best Actor Drama Serial in a Supporting Role

See also
 List of Lollywood actors

References

External links

1969 births
Living people
Pakistani male television actors
People from Quetta
Pakistani male film actors
Pakistani film producers
Pakistani television producers